British Gas plc was an energy and home services provider in the United Kingdom. It was formed when the British Gas Corporation was privatised as a result of the Gas Act 1986, instigated by the government of Margaret Thatcher and superseding the Gas Act 1972.

History
The company was formed when the Conservative Government privatised the British Gas Corporation in December 1986, with its shares floated on the London stock market. To encourage individuals to become shareholders, the offer was intensely advertised with the "If you see Sid...Tell him!" campaign. The privatisation was criticised by Baron Gray of Contin who said it broke a key part of the Conservative's 1983 manifesto that the party would not simply replace one monopoly with another; at the time, British Gas was the only organisation that could supply gas to anyone in the country.

In June 1991, chairman Robert Evans sparked controversy by accepting a pay rise of 66%, ten times above the rate of inflation at the time. This took his salary from £222,000 to £370,000, a pay rise which was condemned by the Labour Party as "sheer unbridled greed". This followed allegations of greed against the organisation a month earlier, when it reported a 42% rise in pre tax profits.

References

Natural gas infrastructure in the United Kingdom
Non-renewable resource companies established in 1986
1986 establishments in the United Kingdom